Neuvilly-en-Argonne is a commune in the Meuse department in Grand Est in north-eastern France.

History
World War I.  The Battle of the Meuse-Argonne was fought in this region.  The 35th Division Field Hospital 140, Sanitary Train Division 110 established a triage center in the bombed out church.  The time frame would have been between September 1918 and October 1918.

See also
Communes of the Meuse department

References

Neuvillyenargonne